The 2022–23 Philippines Football League, also known as The Philippines Football League brought to you by Qatar Airways for sponsorship reasons, is the fifth season of Philippines Football League (PFL), the professional football league of the Philippines. This is the second season of the PFL under the sponsorship of Qatar Airways. The season started on August 7, 2022, and will conclude in May 2023, marking the first time during the Philippines Football League era that a season takes place over two years rather than just one. The league is contested by seven teams, the most since the 2019 season, which played each other four times during the season. Each team will play 24 matches in total, the most since the 2019 season.

The 2021 Philippines Football League season was planned to commence in late 2021 but was cancelled due to the COVID-19 pandemic, and was eventually replaced by the league cup tournament, the 2021 Copa Paulino Alcantara. Marking a change in the format of the previous seasons, the 2022 Copa Paulino Alcantara was held before the league season, with United City emerging as first-time winners of the competition. The success of the Copa, as well as the easing of COVID-19 restrictions and the return of fans, prompted the league season to resume in August.

The 2022 season saw the first time since 2019 that teams will play home and away. Several changes were witnessed in the league's system, such as the format changing from an intra-year to an inter-year format, with seasons spanning two years rather than one. After changing the foreigner restrictions in the Copa Paulino Alcantara, the league also increased its foreigner count from 3+1 to 5+1, adhering to the new AFC regulations. While all matches were held at the PFF National Training Center for the 2020 season, matches are played in the home stadiums of the PFL clubs for the 2022 season, with plans to allow fans back after the success of the 2022 Copa Paulino Alcantara. Dynamic Herb Cebu is the only new team competing for this season.

Format changes
Since the league was last held in 2020, there have been several changes. All six teams of the 2020 season are set to compete, with Dynamic Herb Cebu being the new team joining after previously competing in the 2021 and 2022 editions of the Copa Paulino Alcantara. While the 2020 edition was held under closed-circuit format to limit the spread of COVID-19, this season marks the first time since 2019 that the league reverts to a home-and-away Round-robin tournament, with all teams playing each other 4 times, for a total of 24 matches.

Since the 2020 Philippines Football League, several clubs have undergone location changes. United City, who previously competed without a home city and stadium, will be temporarily based in Capas, Tarlac, while their stadium is under construction. After the 2022–23 season, they will rename to United Clark from United City. Maharlika Manila, who also competed without a home stadium but represented the city of Manila, will play their games at the Rizal Memorial Stadium.

The most noticeable change this season is the league changing its format for scheduling. Previously, the league followed the scheduling system of most Asian leagues such as the Singapore Premier League or Malaysia Super League. However, in 2022, the Asian Football Confederation changed its system of scheduling, shifting from an intra- to an inter-year system. Several leagues followed this, such as the Thai League 1, the Indonesia Liga 1, and the Indian Super League, prompting the PFL to switch to this format as well.

Teams
All 6 clubs from the previous PFL season are set to compete, with Maharlika Manila and United City competing for the first time in 2 years, having taken a break during the 2021 Copa Paulino Alcantara. Dynamic Herb Cebu were given a provisional club license, which would have allow the club to debut in the cancelled 2021 season, but due to the season's cancellation, 2022 will be their first league season in the Philipine top flight.

Two potential new entries in the 2022 season were LAOS (Leyte Association of Organized Sports), who last competed in the 2016 United Football League, and new club Rapids F.C. from Cagayan de Oro. The two clubs started their license application process at the same time as Dynamic Herb Cebu. However, the PFF approved Cebu's license while the other two clubs' licenses were still found lacking in requirements. United City withdrew mid-season in February 2023.

Stadiums and locations
Several of the teams have nominated venues as temporary home venues due to their home stadiums being under construction. United City is temporarily based in the New Clark City Athletics Stadium, while Mendiola 1991 is temporarily holding their home matches in the City of Imus Grandstand and Track Oval. United City plan to hold their future home matches in their "field of dreams" in Pampanga while Mendiola 1991 will build their stadium in Taytay, Rizal.

In February 2022, the McKinley Hill Stadium in Taguig was approved by the PFL as Maharlika Manila's home stadium.

Personnel and kits
As part of the criteria imposed by the sponsorship of Qatar Airways, each team's kit should contain the Qatar Airways logo where the manufacturer's logo would usually be. The official logo of the PFL should also be placed on one of the sleeves of the kit.

Notes:
 Located on the front of the shirt.
 Located on the back of the shirt.
 Located on the sleeves.
 Located on the shorts.

Coaching changes

Foreign players
A maximum of six foreigners are allowed per club, with five players of any nationality and a sixth coming from an AFC member nation. This is in line with the upcoming AFC regulations that allow for more foreigners to be signed by clubs. However, only 4 foreign players can be registered in the starting 11 during a matchday, with one of them being from an AFC member nation. A further two foreign substitutes may be placed on the bench.

Players name in bold indicates the player was registered during the mid-season transfer window. The window lasted from 1 January 2023 to 26 March 2023, with the initial deadline for registered squads set on February 9.

Notes
1. Former players only include players who left after the start of the 2022–23 season.
2. Jesse Curran was originally a citizen of Australia but was called up by the Philippines national football team to participate in the 2022 FAS Tri-Nations Series, while Simen Lyngbø was considered a Norwegian import until he played for the Philippines in the 2022 AFF Championship.

League table

Positions by round

Results by round

Results 
The seven clubs will play each other in two rounds of home and away matches. A total of 82 matches will be played. United City withdrew mid-season in February 2023 and will not feature in the second round.

First round

Second round

Season statistics

Scoring

Top goalscorers

Top assists

Own goals

Hat-tricks 

Note
(H) – Home ; (A) – Away

4 Player scored four goals

Clean sheets

Discipline

Red cards

Awards

References

Philippines
Philippines
Philippines Football League seasons